The 2010 international cricket season was between May and August 2010. The season included a spot-fixing scandal involving the Pakistan team that resulted in three Pakistani cricketers being banned by the International Cricket Council and given prison sentences.

Season overview

Pre-season rankings

April

Canada in the West Indies

Ireland in the West Indies

2010 ICC World Twenty20

Group stage

 Afghanistan and Ireland qualified via the 2010 ICC World Twenty20 Qualifier.
 Zimbabwe withdrew from the 2009 competition, so failing to achieve a seed or ranking for the 2010 competition.
 Ireland reached the Super Eight stage of the 2009 competition, and if a test nation, would have been ranked 8th; hence an 8th seed is missing from the competition

Super Eights

Knockout stage

May

South Africa in the West Indies

New Zealand vs Sri Lanka

Bangladesh in England

Tri-Nation Series in Zimbabwe

June

India in Zimbabwe

Scotland in the Netherlands

Asia Cup

Australia in Ireland

England in Scotland

Australia in England

July

WCL Division One

Group stage

Australia vs Pakistan

Bangladesh in Ireland

India in Sri Lanka

Bangladesh in Scotland

Pakistan in England

August

Sri Lanka Triangular Series

WCL Division Four

Group stage

Final Placings

Afghanistan in Scotland

Netherlands in Ireland

Season summary

Result Summary

Milestones

Test
  Jacques Kallis reached 11,000 runs scored in Tests, vs West Indies on 19 June. (6th in All time)
  Ricky Ponting reached 12,000 runs scored in Tests, vs Pakistan on 22 July. (2nd in All time)
  Muttiah Muralitharan reached 800 wickets taken in Tests, vs India on 22 July. (1st in All time)
Sachin Tendulkar reached 14,000 runs scored in Tests vs Australia.(1st in All time)
Sachin Tendulkar became the first batsman to reach 50 Test Centuries in Tests vs South Africa. (1st in All time)

ODI
  Ricky Ponting reached 13,000 runs scored in ODIs, vs England on 30 June. (3rd in All time)
  Mahela Jayawardene reached 9,000 runs scored in ODIs, vs India on 28 August. (13th in All time)

T20I
  Brendon McCullum reached 1,000 runs scored in T20Is, vs Zimbabwe on 4 May. (1st in All time)

Records

Test

Sachin Tendulkar played highest number of Test Matches (176*) vs  on 26 December.

Mohammad Amir became the youngest player to take 5 wickets in England (18 years 130 days).

Jonathan Trott and Stuart Broad set the highest 8th wicket partnership, 332 runs, in Test history in the 4th
Test Match between England and Pakistan at Lords.

ODI
Sachin Tendulkar scored 200* vs  1st Double century in History of ODI Cricket

References

2010 in cricket